Snapshot is a studio album by American keyboardist George Duke released in 1992 on Warner Bros Records. The album reached No. 1 on the Billboard Top Contemporary Jazz Albums chart and No. 36 on the Billboard Top R&B Albums chart. Duke dedicated the album to his mother, Beatrice Burrell Duke, "who brought the camera and showed me how to use it".

Critical reception

Mitchell May of the Chicago Tribune found that "This is a well-balanced trip into the jazz-fusion Duke has honed over the last two decades. Deftly mixing supple instrumentation with guest vocalists (Jeffrey Osborne, Deniece Williams, Keith Washington), Duke and a small army of sidemen provide plenty of jazz-inflected hooks. 
Jonathan Widran of AllMusic wrote "With a several decade career as an artist and producer successfully spanning the realms of bebop, fusion, soul, and funk, nothing gives George Duke more pleasure than being able to go back to his basics as an acoustic jazz pianist on his smooth, multifaceted Warner Bros. debut, Snapshot. The keyboardist takes listeners on a whimsical, generally cool journey through the myriad styles he's purveyed over the years: Latin, pop, R&B, and live-in-the-studio jazz. Snapshot seems divided by Duke's pop sensibilities and these urges to simplify those electronic trappings." Widran added "overall, Snapshot nicely reflects the state of Duke circa early '90s smooth jazz. Cut through the chaff and the remaining wheat here represents an artist pretty much doing what he does best: a little bit of everything in a mostly artistically satisfying manner."
Josef Woodard of Entertainment Weekly exclaimed "R&B is the foundation of Snapshot‘s tracks, and soul stars such as Jeffrey Osborne and Deniece Williams serve up vocal cameos. But Duke’s harmonic savvy, as well as some crisp jazz riffs, keep this smooth, agreeable album from the numbskullduggery of its ”contemporary jazz” contemporaries."

Track listing
All tracks composed by George Duke; except where indicated

Personnel
George Duke - vocals, keyboards
Chanté Moore, Deniece Williams, Howard Hewett, Jeffrey Osborne, Keith Washington, Lori Perry, Phil Perry, Philip Bailey - vocals on "Fame"
Paul Jackson Jr., Charles Johnson, Ray Fuller - guitar
Larry Kimpel, Byron Miller - bass
Leon Ndugu Chancler, Dennis Chambers - drums
Airto Moreira, Paulinho Da Costa, Sheila Escovedo - percussion
Everette Harp, Larry Williams - saxophone
George Howard - soprano saxophone
Gary Grant, Jerry Hey, Oscar Brashear - trumpet
Reggie Young - trombone
Hubert Laws - flute
Alex Brown, Angel Rogers, Carl Carwell, Chanté Moore, Jeffrey Osborne, Jim Gilstrap, Lori Perry, Lynn Davis, Marcy Levy, Phil Perry, Rachelle Ferrell - backing vocals

References

1992 albums
Warner Records albums
Albums produced by George Duke
George Duke albums